

Plesiosaurs

Newly named plesiosaurs

Museums
 The Albany Museum of Grahamstown, South Africa is established.

See also

References

1850s in paleontology
Paleontology